Togepsyllinae is a bug subfamily of jumping plant-lice in the family Aphalaridae.

References

External links 

Aphalaridae